Jakub Jeřábek (born 12 May 1991) is a Czech professional ice hockey defenseman who is currently playing with HC Oceláři Třinec in the Czech Extraliga (ELH).

Playing career
Jeřábek played as a youth with his hometown club, HC Plzeň. Undrafted, he remained in the Czech Republic and made his senior debut with Plzeň in the Czech Extraliga during the 2008–09 season.

Over the following three seasons, Jeřábek continued his development before cementing a full-time role on the blueline of Plzeň in the 2012–13 season. In establishing himself as the club's top defenseman, Jeřábek was recognised in the 2015–16 season, as the league's best defenseman in compiling 33 points in 52 games with Plzeň.

To play at a higher level, Jeřábek left Plzeň after eight senior seasons in signing a one-year contract with Russian outfit, Vityaz of the Kontinental Hockey League (KHL) on 5 May 2016. In the ensuing 2016–17 season, Jeřábek instantly assumed the role as Vityaz's top pairing defenseman. He led the blueline with 5 goals and 29 assists for 34 points in 59 games, placing him 6th in overall scoring. He was also selected to represent Vityaz at the 2017 KHL All-Star Game.

In attracting NHL interest and at the conclusion of his contract with Vityaz, Jeřábek signed a one-year, entry-level contract with the Montreal Canadiens on 1 May 2017. In the 2017–18 season, Jeřábek was initially assigned to AHL affiliate, Laval Rocket. On 22 November 2017, he received his first recall to the NHL. He appeared in 25 games with the Canadiens before on 21 February 2018, Jeřábek was traded to the Washington Capitals in exchange for a fifth-round pick in the 2019 NHL Entry Draft. Jeřábek played in 11 games during his first season with the Capitals, and scored his only goal with the Caps against his former team in a March game against the Canadiens. Jeřábek also started the first two playoff games of the first round against the Columbus Blue Jackets during the Capitals' 2018 Stanley Cup run, but was subsequently scratched for fellow rookie Christian Djoos.

As a free agent from the Cup-winning Capitals, Jeřábek was signed to a one-year contract with the Edmonton Oilers on 20 August 2018. Before starting the 2018–19 season, Jeřábek was traded to the St. Louis Blues for a conditional 6th-round draft pick in the 2020 NHL Entry Draft. He played in a single game with the Blues before he was placed on waivers and re-assigned to AHL affiliate, the San Antonio Rampage, for the remainder of the season.

On 3 May 2019, as an impending free agent from the Blues, Jeřábek opted to leave the NHL and return on a one-year contract to Russian club, HC Vityaz of the KHL. Following two seasons with Vityaz Podolsk, Jeřábek left as a free agent and was signed to a one-year contract to continue in the KHL with HC Spartak Moscow on 29 July 2021.

On 6 June 2022, as a free agent, Jeřábek opted to return to his native Czech Republic, returning to the ELH after six years in agreeing to a one-year contract with HC Oceláři Třinec.

International play
Jeřábek captained the junior Czech Republic team at the 2011 World Junior Championships and was the third highest scoring defenceman of the tournament, after Ryan Ellis and Dmitri Orlov.

Career statistics

Regular season and playoffs

International

Awards and honours

References

External links
 

1991 births
Living people
Czech ice hockey defencemen
Laval Rocket players
Montreal Canadiens players
Piráti Chomutov players
HC Plzeň players
Sportspeople from Plzeň
St. Louis Blues players
San Antonio Rampage players
HC Spartak Moscow players
Stanley Cup champions
Undrafted National Hockey League players
HC Vityaz players
Washington Capitals players
Ice hockey players at the 2022 Winter Olympics
Olympic ice hockey players of the Czech Republic
Czech expatriate ice hockey players in Russia
Czech expatriate ice hockey players in Canada
Czech expatriate ice hockey players in the United States